Saint-Étienne-les-Orgues (Provençal: Sant Estève deis Òrgues) is a commune in the Alpes-de-Haute-Provence department in southeastern France.

Population

See also
Communes of the Alpes-de-Haute-Provence department

References

External links

 Official site

Communes of Alpes-de-Haute-Provence
Alpes-de-Haute-Provence communes articles needing translation from French Wikipedia